Bilawal Afridi is a Pakistani politician who had been a member of the Provincial Assembly of Khyber Pakhtunkhwa from August 2019 till January 2023.

Political career
Afridi contested 2019 Khyber Pakhtunkhwa provincial election on 20 July 2019 from constituency PK-106 (Khyber-II) as an Independent. He won the election by the majority of 6,349 votes over the runner up Amir Muhammad Khan Afridi of Pakistan Tehreek-e-Insaf. He garnered 12,800 votes while Amir Afridi received 6,551 votes.

References

Living people
Independent MPAs (Khyber Pakhtunkhwa)
Politicians from Khyber Pakhtunkhwa
Year of birth missing (living people)